The Guiers Vif (literally live Guiers) is a river in Auvergne-Rhône-Alpes in eastern France. It is located in the Regional Natural Park of Chartreuse, on the border between the municipalities of Saint-Pierre-d'Entremont (Isère) and Saint-Pierre-d'Entremont (Savoie). Its source is in the Cirque de Saint-Même. It flows towards the northwest. For most of its course, the river forms the border between the departments of Isère and Savoie. Near the communes of Entre-deux-Guiers and Les Echelles, it ends after  as a right tributary of the Guiers.

References 

Rivers of France
Rivers of Auvergne-Rhône-Alpes
Rivers of Isère
Rivers of Savoie